The Orient tricycle was an early motorized tricycle (classified as a motorcycle under some definitions). It was manufactured by Charles H. Metz's  Waltham Manufacturing Company in Waltham, Massachusetts and advertised in 1899 as a "motor cycle", the first use of the term in a published catalog.

Orient advertised that the single-person tricycle could be converted to a two-person four wheeled "autogo" in five minutes. A 1900 Orient appeared in The Art of the Motorcycle exhibition at Guggenheim Museum in New York.

Specifications
Specifications in infobox to the right are from Garson, and from Krens.

Notes and references

Notes

References

Further reading

 — with some information on serial numbers

See also
List of motorized trikes
Safety bicycle
List of motorcycles of the 1890s

Motorcycles of the United States
Motorcycles introduced in the 1890s
Motorized tricycles